Adam David Deitch (born April 26, 1976) is a Grammy-nominated American record producer and drummer based in Denver, Colorado. He is the drummer for the bands Lettuce, Break Science, and The Adam Deitch Quartet, and has worked in the hip hop, funk, electro, pop, and jazz genres. He has collaborated with renowned artists like 50 Cent, Talib Kweli, John Scofield, and Ledisi.

He was nominated for the 2010 Grammy Award for Best R&B Album for writing and producing two songs on Ledisi's album Turn Me Loose as part of the Fyre Dept. production team.  He was also nominated for the 2019 Grammy Award for Best Contemporary Instrumental Album for Lettuce's album Elevate.

In 2014, Deitch started his own record label, Golden Wolf Records, through which he's released music from his solo project (Adam Deitch) and The Adam Deitch Quartet (Adam Deitch - Drums // Wil Blades - Organ // Eric “Benny” Bloom - Trumpet // Ryan Zoidis - Saxophone).  Deitch also co-founded Royal Family Records.

In 2021, Deitch also launched his own subscription-based drum lesson platform, called Deitch Academy.

Discography

As producer and drummer
 Outta Here (Lettuce)
 Live in Tokyo (Lettuce)
 Rage! (Lettuce)
 Fly (Lettuce)
 Crush (Lettuce)
Mt. Crushmore (Lettuce)
Witches Stew (Lettuce)
Elevate (Lettuce)
Resonate (Lettuce)
Age of Imperfection (Adam Deitch)
Sky's Alive (Adam Deitch)
I Get A Rush (Adam Deitch)
Egyptian Secrets (Adam Deitch Quartet)
 Illusion (Pharoahe Monche)
 W.A.R. (We Are Renegades) (Pharoahe Monche)
 Further Than Our Eyes Can See (Break Science)
 Knockin', Say No, & Turn Me Loose Turn Me Loose (Ledisi album) (Ledisi)
 Monolith Code (Break Science)
 Seven Bridges (Break Science)

As producer
 My Gun Go Off Curtis (50 Cent album) (50 Cent)
 Tiger Style Crane Reggie (album) (Redman (rapper))
 The Nature Eardrum (album) (Talib Kweli)
 Scandalous Bitches Full Circle (Xzibit album) (Xzibit)
 Struggla Light (Matisyahu album) (Matisyahu)
 Controcultura, Le Donne, & Spara Al Diavolo Controcultura (Fabri Fibra)
 Harder' The Hear After (J-Live)

As drummer
 Überjam (John Scofield)
 Up All Night (John Scofield album) (John Scofield)
 Ladies & Thugs Trauma (album) (DJ Quik)
 Greatest Hits: Live at the House of Blues( DJ Quik)
 Tonight (DVD) (Average White Band)
 Nü Revolution (Les Nubians)
 Reminisce (Eric Krasno (Soulive))
 Pretty Lights
 The Purge (DRKWAV)
 Überjam Deux'' (John Scofield)

References

External links
 Stay Thirsty Interview with Adam Deitch
 Tama Drums Interview with Adam Deitch
 2012 Audio Interview with Adam Deitch from the Podcast "I'd Hit That"

American drummers
Living people
Musicians from New York City
1976 births